Wasyl "William" Fedun (August 5, 1879 – November 14, 1949) was a Member of the Legislative Assembly of Alberta,  Canada from 1921 to 1926.

He was born in Eastern Galicia.

William Fedun was elected to the northern Alberta, Victoria provincial electoral district in the 1921 Alberta general election for the United Farmers of Alberta. He defeated long time Liberal MLA Francis Walker who was one of the last original members in the provincial legislature.

He served one full term in office as a backbencher in the United Farmers government.

Fedun did not run again in 1926

He died in 1949 in Lamont, Alberta and was buried in Andrew, Alberta.

References

External links
Alberta Legislature Membership Listing

United Farmers of Alberta MLAs
1949 deaths
1879 births
People from Lamont, Alberta
People from Lviv Oblast
Ukrainian emigrants to Canada
Austro-Hungarian emigrants to Canada
Ukrainian Austro-Hungarians
People from the Kingdom of Galicia and Lodomeria